The 1932 United States presidential election in Iowa took place on November 8, 1932, as part of the 1932 United States presidential election. Iowa voters chose 11 representatives, or electors, to the Electoral College, who voted for president and vice president.

Iowa was won by Governor Franklin D. Roosevelt (D–New York), running with Speaker John Nance Garner, with 57.69% of the popular vote, against incumbent President Herbert Hoover (R–California), running with Vice President Charles Curtis, with 39.98% of the popular vote. This is the only occasion since the Civil War when Cass County and Page County have voted for a Democratic Presidential candidate.

As a result of his win, Roosevelt became the first Democratic presidential candidate since Woodrow Wilson in 1912 to win Iowa and the first since Franklin Pierce in 1852 to win the state with a majority of the popular vote (Wilson had won Iowa in 1912, but only with a plurality of 39.30% of the popular vote).

Results

Results by county

See also
 United States presidential elections in Iowa

References

Iowa
1932
1932 Iowa elections